is a Japanese popular term for those individuals certified as  by the Minister of Education, Culture, Sports, Science and Technology as based on Japan's . The term "Living National Treasure" is not formally mentioned in the law, but is an informal term referencing the cultural properties designated as the National Treasures.

The Japanese government provides a subsidy of 2 million yen per person per year for Living National Treasures. The total amount of the subsidy is determined by the national budget, and since 2002 it has been 232 million yen. Therefore, the number of Living National Treasures in existence is a maximum of 116, and if there are 116 Living National Treasures, no person with any outstanding skills will be newly designated as a Living National Treasure unless a vacancy occurs due to death.

History 

Under the 1950 Law for Protection of Cultural Properties, intangible cultural properties are defined as dramatic, musical, artistic, and other intangible cultural artifacts of high value in terms of Japanese history or art (Article 2, Section 1, Part 2).  Those intangible cultural properties of especial importance can be designated as "Important Intangible Cultural Properties" by the Minister of Education, Culture, Sports, Science and Technology (Article 71, Section 1).

In other words, intangible cultural properties are certain artistic skills. Those individuals or groups who have attained high levels of mastery in those certain skills can be designated as preservers of them by the Japanese government for the purpose of ensuring their continuation. Living National Treasure is a term for those designated as keepers of important intangible cultural properties. It is considered to be a great honor as a national living treasure.

Types of certification 

There are three types of certification: 

 : this designation is for individuals who "have attained high mastery" of an art or craft.
 : this designation is for groups of 2 or more who as a group working in common have attained high mastery of an art or craft.
 : this designation is for large groups who have mastered an art or craft in which individual character is not emphasized.

Of the three types, generally only those to have received "Individual Certification" are referred to as Living National Treasures. Those working in artistic fields such as drama and music receive Individual and Collective Certifications, while those working in the crafts receive Individual or Preservation Group Certifications.

Support system

The Japanese government, with the goal of preserving important intangible cultural assets, provides a special annual grant of 2 million yen to Living National Treasures. In the case of groups, the government helps defray the costs of public exhibitions and activities necessary to continue the group. The National Theater of Japan provides training programs to help train successors in such arts as Noh, and kabuki.

Many of the craft artisans are also members of the Japan Kōgei Association.

Categories

To date Living National Treasures have been certified for 16 categories of Intangible Cultural Properties:

 Performing Arts: , Noh, Kabuki, Music, Dance, and Drama
 Japanese crafts: Ceramics, Textiles, Lacquerware, Metalworking, Dollmaking, Woodworking, Papermaking, Bamboo weaving, and Miscellaneous Crafts

List of Living National Treasures
 List of Living National Treasures of Japan (performing arts)
 List of Living National Treasures of Japan (crafts)

See also
 Living National Treasure (South Korea)
 National Living Treasures of the Philippines (Gawad Manlilikha ng Bayan)

References

Arts in Japan